Rani Ratnamala Devi was an Indian politician and member of the Indian National Congress. Ratnamala Devi was a member of the Madhya Pradesh Legislative Assembly from the Chandrapur constituency in Janjgir-Champa district on Bharatiya Janata Party ticket.

She was one of the 12 BJP MLA who had defected from the Bhartiya Janata Party and floated a suffix 'Party' called Chhattisgarh Vikas Party in order to avoid anti-defection law and merged into the Indian National Congress the next day.

References 

People from Janjgir-Champa district
Indian National Congress politicians from Chhattisgarh
Bharatiya Janata Party politicians from Chhattisgarh
Madhya Pradesh MLAs 1998–2003
Living people
21st-century Indian politicians
Chhattisgarh politicians
Year of birth missing (living people)